Kilbaha is a small fishing village in County Clare, Ireland. It is located close to the western end of the Loop Head peninsula on the R487 road.

History
According to Parliamentary Gazetteer of Ireland 1845 the village had a population of 460 in 1831, and 531 in 1841.
A small open sweep of the estuary at the place is sometimes called Kilbaha bay.

Location and transport

Kilbaha is in the parish of Cross in the Roman Catholic Diocese of Killaloe.
The parish churches are Our Lady of Lourdes in Cross and the Star of the Sea church in Kilbaha (incorrectly described on the diocesan website as the Church of St John the Baptist.)
The village is near the tip of the Loop Head peninsula.

It is surrounded by the waters of the Atlantic Ocean and the River Shannon. It is a place of outstanding natural beauty. The local pub Keating's claims to be the nearest pub to New York City.

Awards
Kilbaha and its setting on the Loop Head peninsula on the west coast of Clare was the winner of a European Destinations of Excellence Award 2010 for Aquatic Tourism.

See also 
List of towns and villages in Ireland

References

Towns and villages in County Clare
Articles on towns and villages in Ireland possibly missing Irish place names